Racic may refer to:

 Račić (disambiguation), several meanings
 Racić